Shukr Kuhayl is the name of two 19th-century Yemenite messianic pretenders:
 Shukr Kuhayl I
 Shukr Kuhayl II, also known as Judah ben Shalom